Ōtsubo, Otsubo or Ootsubo (written: 大坪) is a Japanese surname. Notable people with the surname include:

, Japanese footballer
, Japanese pole vaulter
, Japanese long-distance runner
, Japanese ice hockey player
, Japanese voice actress

Japanese-language surnames